In mathematics, orthogonal polynomials on the unit circle are families of polynomials that are orthogonal with respect to integration over the unit circle in the complex plane, for some probability measure on the unit circle.

Definition

Suppose that  is a probability measure on the unit circle in the complex plane, whose support is not finite.

The Szegő recurrence 

Szegő's recurrence states that

where

is the polynomial with its coefficients reversed and complex conjugated, and where the Verblunsky coefficients  are complex numbers with absolute values less than 1.

Verblunsky's theorem

Verblunsky's theorem states that any sequence of complex numbers in the open unit disk is the sequence of Verblunsky coefficients for a unique probability measure on the unit circle with infinite support.

Geronimus's theorem
Geronimus's theorem states that the Verblunsky coefficients of the measure μ are the Schur parameters of the function  defined by the equations

Baxter's theorem

Baxter's theorem states that the Verblunsky coefficients form an absolutely convergent series if and only if the moments of  form an absolutely convergent series and the weight function  is strictly positive everywhere.

Szegő's theorem

Szegő's theorem states that 
 
where  is the absolutely continuous part of the measure .

Rakhmanov's theorem

Rakhmanov's theorem states that if the absolutely continuous part  of the measure  is positive almost everywhere then the Verblunsky coefficients  tend to 0.

Examples

The Rogers–Szegő polynomials are an example of orthogonal polynomials on the unit circle.

References

Orthogonal polynomials